Mohammad Azizur Rahman (born: 1 January 1945) Retired Major General of Bangladesh Army and a heroic freedom fighter of the Liberation War. For his bravery in the war of independence, the government of Bangladesh awarded him the title of Bir Uttam.

He served as the Director General of Bangladesh Rifles from 25 August 1996 to 30 December 1999.

Early life 
Rahman was born on 1 January 1945 in Beanibazar of Sylhet district. His ancestral home is in Chattis villages of Ranaping in Golapganj. His father's name was Sarafat Ali and his mother's name was Mahibun Nesha. He had to study in Sunamganj, Habiganj and Sylhet as his father's workplace. He graduated from Sylhet MC College with an Intermediate and Jagannath College in Dhaka. His wife's name is Selina Aziz. They have one daughter and one son.

Career 
Azizur joined the army in 1966 and trained at the Pakistan Military Academy in Kakul. After commission in April 1968, he joined the 2nd East Bengal Regiment at Lahore. He was later transferred to Joydebpur in Dhaka with the 2nd East Bengal Regiment. He was promoted to the rank of Major General through periodic promotions. In 1995, he was the Area Commander of Chittagong Region and GOC of the 24th Infantry Division. He served as the Director General of Bangladesh Rifles from 25 August 1996 to 30 December 1999. He was the Chairman of the Water Development Board and also served as the Ambassador of Bangladesh to Bahrain.

Role in the war of liberation 
On 9 April 1971, he was awarded the title of 'Bir Uttam' for his unparalleled bravery in the battle of Keenbridge over the Surma River in Sylhet.

Awards and honors 

 Bir Uttam

References 

Living people
1945 births
Recipients of the Bir Uttom
Director Generals of Border Guards Bangladesh
Bangladesh Army generals
People from Sylhet District
Jagannath University alumni
Murari Chand College alumni
Bangladeshi military personnel
People of the Bangladesh Liberation War
Mukti Bahini personnel